André Eugène Maurice Charlot (26 July 1882 – 20 May 1956) was a French impresario known primarily for the successful musical revues he staged in London between 1912 and 1937. He also worked as a character actor in numerous films.

Early life and career
Born in Paris, Charlot began his career as the assistant manager of several theatres in the French capital, including the Folies Bergère and the Théâtre du Palais-Royal. In 1912 he relocated to London and became the joint manager of the Alhambra Theatre, where he began presenting productions noted for their elegance and simplicity rather than lavish Ziegfeld-like stagings.

Although he was instrumental in giving Noël Coward his first big break, Charlot's first meeting with the aspiring writer was less than successful. In 1917, Coward auditioned some of his material for the producer, who was unimpressed. "He plays the piano badly and sings worse," he complained to Beatrice Lillie, who had introduced the two men, adding, "Kindly do not waste my time with people like that ever again." The following year he purchased one of Coward's songs, "Peter Pan," for Tails Up!, and in 1923 he staged London Calling!, Coward's first publicly produced musical work. It included the tune "Parisian Pierrot," sung by Gertrude Lawrence, which proved to be Coward's first big hit and one of his signature tunes. Although the show was a success, Charlot and Coward never collaborated on such a large scale again.

Andre Charlot's Revue of 1924,
starring Lillie, Lawrence, Jessie Matthews, Effie Atherton and Jack Buchanan, was a major hit on Broadway. Ticket demand was such that the original six-week run was extended to nine months, and it ultimately ran for 298 performances.

With the Great Depression, theatre attendance dropped dramatically, and Charlot was forced into temporary bankruptcy after the failure of Wonder Bar in 1930. That same year he collaborated with Alfred Hitchcock, Jack Hulbert, and Paul Murray on direction of the film Elstree Calling. After producing a series of smaller London revues, he moved to Hollywood, where between 1942 and 1955 he appeared in 50 films, often in small, uncredited roles. Among them were The Constant Nymph, Passage to Marseille, The Song of Bernadette, Lady on a Train, The Dolly Sisters, Julia Misbehaves, That Forsyte Woman, Annie Get Your Gun, The Snows of Kilimanjaro, and Interrupted Melody.

Personal life

Charlot was married to Florence Gladman, with whom he had two children. He died of cancer in Woodland Hills, California, aged 73.

Filmography

References

External links
 
 
 

French theatre managers and producers
French male film actors
Male actors from Paris
1882 births
1956 deaths
20th-century French male actors
French expatriate male actors in the United States